Walter Chyzowych (April 20, 1937 – September 2, 1994) was a Ukrainian-born soccer player who played for Philadelphia Ukrainian Nationals and Newark Sitch of the American Soccer League and was later a coach for the
United States national soccer team. His older brother Gene Chyzowych (1935–2014) was also a professional soccer player and coach.

Chyzowych moved to the United States at an early age and was two-time first team All-American at Temple University where he attended from 1957–1961, setting a team record for goals with 25. His first club team was Toronto City from 1961–1964. In 1964, Chyzowych earned his first cap with the national team; in total, he earned three caps. Chyzowych also played one season for the Philadelphia Spartans of the National Professional Soccer League in 1967; he played 15 games earning three goals and three assists.

Chyzowych began his coaching career while as a caretaker manager, coaching the Philadelphia Textile from 1961–1963. 
Alongside Gene Hart doing play-by-play, he provided color commentary for the 1973 Finals of the North American Soccer League between the Philadelphia Atoms and the Dallas Tornado. He also served as the touchline reporter at Soccer Bowl '77. Chyzowych was the director of coaching for the U.S. Soccer Federation from 1975–1981. He coached the National Team from 1976–1980, including the qualification rounds for the 1978 and 1982 World Cups. His biggest win while with the National Team was 2–0 upset of Hungary in 1979. Overall, he had a respectable 8–14–10 record while with the national team. In 1986, he was named head coach at Wake Forest University, leading the team to four NCAA bids and one ACC championship in eight years.

Chyzowych was inducted in the National Soccer Hall of Fame in 1997.

References 
Notes

External links
Page of information about Chyzowych.
Walter Chyzowych Fund homepage.
Ukrainian Football Diaspora @ Sport.ua

1937 births
1994 deaths
People from Lviv Oblast
People from Lwów Voivodeship
American soccer players
American expatriate soccer players
American Soccer League (1933–1983) players
National Professional Soccer League (1967) players
Chicago Spurs players
Philadelphia Spartans players
Philadelphia Ukrainian Nationals players
American soccer coaches
Polish emigrants to the United States
Wake Forest Demon Deacons men's soccer coaches
National Soccer Hall of Fame members
North American Soccer League (1968–1984) commentators
United States men's international soccer players
United States men's national soccer team managers
Eastern Canada Professional Soccer League players
Toronto City players
Temple Owls men's soccer players
Expatriate soccer players in Canada
Association football forwards
Major Indoor Soccer League (1978–1992) commentators